2014 Sevens Grand Prix Series is the 13th round of the Sevens Grand Prix Series (formerly known as the European Sevens Championship) for rugby sevens organised by the FIRA – Association of European Rugby.

Series

Lyon

Moscow

Manchester

Bucharest

Grand Prix standings

Note: England finishes above Russia due to tiebreaker of highest point difference.

References

External links
FIRA AER web Site 

Grand Prix Series
2014
International rugby union competitions hosted by Russia
International rugby union competitions hosted by Romania
International rugby union competitions hosted by England
International rugby union competitions hosted by France
2013–14 in European rugby union
2014–15 in European rugby union
2013–14 in French rugby union
2014–15 in English rugby union
2014 in Russian rugby union
2014 in Romanian sport